Omary Rajabu Tambwe (born August 11, 1985) is a Tanzanian media personality, Content Creator, Brand Influencer and entrepreneur. Known as Lil Ommy, he is known for hosting “The Switch” a radio show about music, news, and culture programming.
He also host “Big Sunday Live”, a TV show on Wasafi TV.

Early career

Born and raised in Tabora, Lil Ommy’s first step in the media saw him navigate the radio business in Tabora by working at Voice of Tabora (VoT) radio.

It was then he got an opportunity to interview music producers, who were the judges for Bongo Star Search show: P. Funk and Master J. These two interviews went viral until he moved to Times FM starting his show The Playlist.

Radio
The Playlist a Bongo flavour and Urban culture entertainment show that promotes the local and African music on Times FM became popular and some of the notable artists who appeared in the show were Wizkid, Davido, Diamond Platnumz, Alikiba, Mwana FA, Vanessa Mdee, 2Baba, Oskido, Sauti Sol, among others.
Later in March 2020 he moved to Wasafi FM where he currently host The Switch, a radio show similar to The Playlist and Big Sunday Live - a TV Show at Wasafi TV.

Awards

{| class="wikitable"
|+
!Year
!Category
!Awards
!Result
|-
|2019
|Best Media Personality
|StarQT
|
|-
|2019
|Radio Personality Of The Year
|Afrimma
|

|-
|2019
|Best Entertainment Host
|2019 African Entertainment Awards USA
|

References 

Tanzanian radio presenters
Tanzanian television presenters
1985 births
Living people